A live house (ライブハウス) is a Japanese live music club – a music venue featuring live music. The term is a Japanese coinage (wasei eigo) and is mainly used in East Asia. It most frequently refers to smaller venues, which may double as bars, especially featuring rock, jazz, blues, and folk music.

History 
Live houses emerged in the early 1970s as part of the booming indie scene. At the beginning, they were kind of rock pubs, where dinner was accompanied by live music. By the end of the decade, chairs were removed and they adopted the format known today. The live house scene got a boost from the phenomena called Tokyo Rockers, a punk rock movement that started in 1978 by the opening of S-Ken studio venue. In the 80s, the Japanese rock scene experienced the so-called band-boom stage, where amateur, indie artists, debuting at small live houses, were picked up by large record labels. The live houses were reduced to a stepping-stone to further one's career and the establishments became part of the music industry cycle, contrary to the original purpose of being unique underground venues for rebellious bands.

One of Tokyo's oldest live houses is Shinjuku-Loft, that opened in 1971 as a jazz café, and Shinjuku-Ruido, that came into existence in 1972. One of the oldest live houses in Kyoto is Coffee House Jittoku (拾得, named after the Chinese monk Shide, "Foundling"), founded in 1973 in an old sake warehouse. In recent years, similar establishments started to appear in big cities in Taiwan, South Korea, China and many of them are also locally called "live houses."

Due to the restrictions during the COVID-19 pandemic in 2020 and 2021, the livelihood of many live houses was jeopardized and several had to shut down. Some live houses tried to organize crowd-funding projects to survive.

References 

Music venues
Japanese rock music